Vera Chino Ely (born June 27, 1943) is a Native American potter from Acoma Pueblo, New Mexico. She is the youngest daughter of Marie Z. Chino, who was also a potter. Vera learned from her mother.

In the late 1970s she worked with her mother doing fine-line painting on some of her pots. In 1979, she participated in the “One Space: Three Visions” exhibition at the Albuquerque Museum.  A collection of her works can be seen at the Peabody Museum of Archaeology and Ethnology at Harvard University in Cambridge, Massachusetts.
  
Vera's sisters, Carrie Charlie (b. 1925), Rose Garcia (b. 1928), and Grace Chino (ca 1929–1994), are all award-winning  Acoma potters.

Further reading
Dillingham, Rick - Fourteen Families in Pueblo Pottery. 1994.
Schaaf, Gregory - Southern Pueblo Pottery: 2,000 Artist Biographies.  2002.

External links
 Vera Chino pottery, holmes.anthropology.museum; accessed January 26, 2016.

References

 Dittert, Alfred E; Fred Plog (1980). Generations in Clay: Pueblo Pottery of the American Southwest. Flagstaff, AZ: Northland Press in cooperation with the American Federation of the Arts. ISBN 0873582713.

1943 births
Native American potters
Living people
People from Acoma Pueblo
Artists from New Mexico
Pueblo artists
20th-century American women artists
Native American women artists
Women potters
American ceramists
American women ceramists
20th-century Native Americans
21st-century Native Americans
20th-century Native American women
21st-century Native American women
21st-century American women artists